Springbokpan is a small suburb along National Road R503 in South Africa, settled near the border of the larger town of Bodibe, Springbokpan is settled by around 100 residents.

See also
Economy of South Africa
History of South Africa

References

Populated places in the Ditsobotla Local Municipality